Tobi 5 - Coptic Calendar - Tobi 7

The sixth day of the Coptic month of Tobi, the fifth month of the Coptic year. On a common year, this day corresponds to January 1, of the Julian Calendar, and January 14, of the Gregorian Calendar. This day falls in the Coptic season of Peret, the season of emergence. On this day, the Coptic Church celebrates the Feast of Circumcision, it is one of the Seven Minor Feasts of the Lord.

Commemorations

Feasts 

 The Honorable Feast of the Circumcision of Christ

Saints 

 The ascension of the Righteous Elijah the Prophet, alive into Heaven 
 The martyrdom of the Four Archons of Esna 
 The departure of Pope Markianos, the 8th Patriarch of the See of Saint Mark 
 The departure of Pope Mark III, the 73rd Patriarch of the See of Saint Mark 
 The departure of Pope Gabriel III, the 77th Patriarch of the See of Saint Mark 
 The departure of Saint Basil the Great, the Archbishop of Caesarea, Cappadocia

Other commemorations 

 The consecration of the Church of Saint Isaac of Tiphre

References 

Days of the Coptic calendar